Ottawa station, or Ottawa Train Station, is the main inter-city train station in Ottawa, Ontario, Canada, operated by Via Rail. The station serves inter-city trains connecting to Toronto, Kingston, Montreal and Quebec City on Via Rail's Corridor Route.

Location

Ottawa station is located at 200 Tremblay Road, which lies directly south of Ontario Highway 417 (known locally as the Queensway) near Exit 117 and east of Riverside Drive (Regional Road 19) in an industrial park area. Its main entrance faces north to Tremblay Road.

South of the station building, trains call at 1 standard-level side platform and 3 low-level island platforms on 5 tracks. The platforms are connected to the main building by an underground walkway that is accessed by a circular ramp or elevator and escalators. The tracks are bordered on the south by offices of the Canada Revenue Agency, surface parking lots and low-rise commercial buildings located on Terminal Avenue.

Northeast of the station main entrance and past Tremblay Station is the Max Keeping Pedestrian Bridge, which crosses Highway 417. It allows access to RCGT Park (a minor-league baseball stadium) as well as the Courtyard by Marriott Ottawa East and Hampton Inn by Hilton Ottawa west of the stadium parking lot. These two hotels are the closest to the station, and are linked to each other by the Ottawa Conference and Event Centre. All of these are accessible within a 12–15 minute walk.

The station is also within the vicinity of a number of big-box stores, including the Ottawa Train Yards shopping complex south of Terminal Avenue. (However, there is no pedestrian bridge over the tracks, so this can only be accessed on foot or by car via Belfast Road.) An office complex of the Royal Canadian Mounted Police is also located to the north east of the station, across the highway cloverleaf and next to the Rideau River.

Railway services
As of June 2022, Ottawa station is served by 2 domestic routes (with connections). All are provided by Via Rail, the primary passenger rail operator in Canada. No overnight long distance trains depart from this station.

Ottawa - Montreal - Sainte Foy - Quebec City

 No local service between Québec City, Sainte-Foy and Charny, or Saint-Lambert and Montréal. Service to Coteau on Fridays only.

Ottawa - Kingston - Toronto

 No local service between Ottawa and Fallowfield, or Guildwood and Toronto.

Structure

Ottawa station is an international style building composed of exposed cantilevered Vierendeel trusses supported by massive concrete piers. This creates a spacious open plan interior with a powerful roofline. The station's walls are a non-loadbearing glass skin and extend through the open steel trusses to the roof deck. None of the interior walls extend above the lower chords of the trusses, allowing for an uninterrupted view of the roof structure.

Inside, an expansive waiting area features a circular ticket office and a descending circular ramp leading to the far platforms.

History

 For more information on the early history of rail in Ottawa, see Ottawa Union Station.

The first passenger rail services in Ottawa began in 1854, with the opening of the Bytown and Prescott Railway. A number of railways would follow, and their various services would eventually be consolidated at Ottawa Union Station (active 1912–1966) at Confederation Square, a short distance from the Parliament buildings and south of the Château Laurier Hotel. However, in 1966 railway services were moved to their current location east of downtown and the Rideau River in the neighbourhood of Eastway Gardens.

The present Ottawa station is the outcome of an urban renewal plan by the French urban planner Jacques Greber, which was commissioned by Prime Minister of Canada William Lyon Mackenzie King, who sought a re-imagining of the city following World War II.

Track relocation
Among the proposals in Greber's city plan was the relocation of railway tracks outside of the downtown core. This was not the first proposal to relocate trackage away from the central sections of Ottawa, as it had previously been discussed as early as 1915 and 1924. At that time, Ottawa was crossed by 11 train lines with over 150 level crossings, causing numerous traffic disruptions. Many of the railroads that crossed the city at the time were originally built in the nineteenth century to serve the lumber industry and were no longer appropriately sited. The tracks divided neighbourhoods and were considered unsightly.

Additionally, trains at that time were pulled by steam locomotives which brought their noise and soot to the downtown Union Station and rail yard. As Time Magazine noted in 1948: "Ottawa, dominated by the anachronistic Gothic buildings of Parliament, has remained frowzy, a city where trains run through the center of town and chuff smoke into the foyer of the best hotel." Greber sought to clean up the downtown by relocating rail traffic outside of the city center. Part of this involved the construction of a new train station.

The final decision to remove tracks from the downtown core was made in 1950, a time when conversion to cleaner  diesel locomotives seemed only a far future possibility. Despite the fact that the transition to diesel occurred far sooner than expected (in 1960), the track relocation and new station plans continued. A land swap was arranged between the Federal District Commission (now National Capital Commission) and the Canadian National and Canadian Pacific railways in which they gave up their downtown railyards east of the Rideau Canal and railway rights of way through Ottawa in exchange for land near Walkley Road, where the Walkley Train Yard would be extended. This reduced the number of trains traveling through the downtown core, opened up new land for development downtown and provided the east-west right of way for what would later become the Queensway (Highway 417).

The new Ottawa station

The site was chosen due to the fact that Ottawa's population was moving southward, it offered easy accessibility to the Queensway and there was ample room for parking. Additionally, the land that would make up the proposed site was already largely owned by the railways and the Government of Canada. It was thought that the terminal would become the hub of a new commercial and industrial area.

The new Ottawa station was built for passenger services of the Canadian National Railway (CNR) and the Canadian Pacific Railway (CPR) companies, and was the last of the monumental union stations to be built in Canada. It was seen as an attempt to project a modern and futuristic image of rail travel in an era when it was being increasingly superseded by other means of transportation.

The station was designed by the modernist architect John Cresswell Parkin of John B. Parkin & Associates in collaboration with the Montreal firm Affleck, Desbarats, Dimakopoulos, Lebensold, Michaud & Sise. Their design reflects a mix of modernism and Beaux Arts planning principles. The station opened on July 31, 1966, just a few months prior to the start of Canadian Centennial celebrations. The first train to arrive was the Canadian Pacific Railway's Rideau from Montreal, which left shortly afterwards at 9:04 a.m. 

Per a sign located inside the station: "The Ottawa Station was completed in 1966 as part of a plan for the relocation and consolidation of many railway lines built between 1854 and 1916. The new arrangement was based on the plans of the noted urban planner, Jacques Greber, and was constructed by the National Capital Commission. The Canadian National Railway and the Canadian Pacific railway are owners and operators of the new installations."

Throughout its history, the station has won a number of architectural awards. It won a Massey Medal for architecture in 1967. In 2000, the Royal Architectural Institute of Canada named the station as one of the top 500 buildings produced in Canada during the last millennium, and in 2007 it was awarded the Landmark Award by the Ontario Association of Architects.

Criticism

While the relocation of Ottawa station seemed to be a good idea in 1948, the move to the outskirts of Ottawa put rail travel at a comparative disadvantage to other forms of transportation in the city. Although passenger rail travel collapsed across North America following World War II, the downtown station may have maintained a higher market share over time and been useful for commuter rail due to its close proximity on foot to many destinations.

Prior to the creation of Via Rail in 1977, closing downtown stations and rebuilding them in suburban areas was an ongoing trend in a number of other cities across Canada, including Quebec City, Saskatoon and Victoria. At the time, it seemed to many local governments that the benefits of removing tracks and railyards from downtown areas outweighed the benefits of providing rail access directly to downtown - as passenger rail appeared to be declining and increasingly irrelevant.

These decisions helped accelerate the decline in passenger rail popularity further, as direct to downtown service was one of the few remaining advantages trains had over airplanes. This could be seen at Ottawa station. While Via Rail provided a shuttle bus to the city centre, the increased distance added up to 25 minutes in travel time to the fastest train to Montreal and reduced its competitiveness with other forms of travel.

In 1985, Via Rail President Pierre Franche estimated that Via lost around 15 to 20 percent of their Ottawa business because of the closing of Union Station.

In addition to its more distant location, public transit service to Ottawa station was absent or minimal for its first 15 years of existence, discouraging access by non-car owning passengers. This was partly remedied in 1983, when OC Transpo constructed a Transitway bus rapid transit station (Train station) across from Ottawa station, which would be replaced by Tremblay O-Train station to the west of the Ottawa station building in 2019.

Continued service reductions in the late 1980s and early 1990s further compounded the declining popularity of train travel in Ottawa. Services to Toronto and Montreal were reduced, and Ottawa lost transcontinental service to Vancouver on the Super Continental when the train was cancelled in 1990.

Heritage designation
The station has been protected under the Heritage Railway Stations Protection Act since 1996.  It "is a glass and steel, International style railway station [...] The VIA Rail Station at Ottawa is one of the finest examples of the International style in Canadian architecture."

Renovation
A $21.7 million renovation project was undertaken from late 2016 to 2018. The project added an elevator to improve accessibility in the spiral ramp and at tracks 3 and 4. The station's Track 1 side platform was also raised from the previous low-level to a standard level for faster and easier boarding. Maintenance work was also conducted on the roof, and a climate controlled waiting area was built next to Track 1 for departing passengers to wait for their trains.

The station management also began working to attain a LEED Silver green building certification from the Canada Green Building Council.

The official certification process began in 2019 and on August 10, 2020, the building achieved a LEED v4.1 Operation and Maintenance: Existing Buildings certification at the Gold level, earning 68 of a possible 100 LEED points.

Accessibility improvements
Following the renovations, Via Rail began a pilot project to test electronic systems that would allow passengers with visual impairments to navigate autonomously between the station entrance and platforms. These tests were carried out in collaboration with the International Union of Railways, Canadian Council of the Blind and the Canadian National Institute for the Blind. The company intends to improve the system and eventually deploy the technology in other stations in its network.

Station services

The station is staffed and offers ticket sales, checked baggage and checkroom service, bicycle box service, an ATM, a cafe/restaurant, vending machines, wifi (in the station and business lounge), telephones and washrooms.

A Via Rail business lounge is located in the southeast corner of the station, adjacent to the tracks. Services include a business centre with computers and a selection of magazines, free newspapers and non-alcoholic beverages. Access is restricted to business class travellers for a maximum of two hours.

The station's entrance, ticket office, washrooms and platforms are wheelchair accessible and a wheelchair lift is available to assist with boarding. Courtesy wheelchairs are provided and curbside assistance is also available on advance request. A service animal relief area is located near the station entrance.

Public transit

Ottawa station connects to local OC Transpo public transportation through the adjacent Tremblay station, located northwest of the main entrance. Tremblay is a stop on the Confederation Line of Ottawa's O-Train light rail system and also serves neighbourhood bus services.

Intercity bus

Ontario Northland
Ottawa station is served by one bus daily on Ontario Northland's routes 501 and 502, which follow Ontario Highway 17 to Sudbury via North Bay.

Orléans Express
Orléans Express services between Gatineau, Kirkland and Montreal run daily from Ottawa station.

Orléans Express schedule as of 13 June 2022:

Pick-up only from Les Promenades Gatineau to Ottawa station. Drop-off only from Kirkland to Montreal. *Limited stops at Kirkland and Montréal–Trudeau International Airport.

Auto
A taxi stand is located outside the main entrance and a Discount Car & Truck Rentals automated kiosk is available immediately inside the main entrance doors.

330 surface lot parking spaces are managed by Indigo Parking. The lot is controlled by an automated, gated system; hourly and monthly rates are available. Inside the lot there is a small electric vehicle charging station.

Bicycle access
Ottawa station is connected to the Capital Pathway bike path system. This makes it somewhat possible to travel most of the way downtown using multi-use paths, dedicated bike lanes or less busy roads.

A path just to the north of Tremblay station connects to the Rideau River Pathway, which provides a slightly longer but easier northbound/westbound route to the city core via Lower Town. Crossing the Rideau River Pedestrian/Cycling Bridge offers a shorter but slightly more complicated westbound route via Sandy Hill, uOttawa and the Rideau Canal Eastern or Western Pathway. Either route requires a 20–30 minute ride.

The Max Keeping Pedestrian Bridge north of the station allows cycling and connects the station to the Overbrook and Vanier neighbourhoods on the other side of Highway 417. It also provides access to Coventry Road and the St. Laurent Centre to the east.

Cycle paths and lanes in Ottawa are mostly used during the more temperate months of the year, but a few are plowed in the winter as part of a winter cycling network.

OC Transpo allows bikes to be brought on board the Confederation Line at Tremblay Station and Via Rail allows them as checked luggage on some trains for an additional fee when checked up to an hour prior to departure.

Airport shuttles
Air France–KLM runs a connecting shuttle bus from this station to Montréal–Pierre Elliott Trudeau International Airport for Air France and KLM passengers only. As of 2016, Air France–KLM has three daily bus services between those cities. Swiss International Air Lines previously operated its Swissbus service from Ottawa station to Montréal–Trudeau International Airport for its passengers.

Area redevelopment
In April 2020, developers Colonnade BridgePort and investment firm Fiera Real Estate acquired the 5 acre industrial site immediately to the east of the station, with plans to develop it into a mixed-use residential and commercial centre. Initial proposals include a cluster of six blocks of mixed-use highrises reaching up to 30 storeys. The project is also expected to include a central park and an extensive network of pedestrian and cycling paths to connect the development with Ottawa and Tremblay stations.

See also
 Ottawa Macdonald–Cartier International Airport
 List of Via Rail stations

References

External links

Geographic data related to Ottawa station on OpenRailwayMap
Station building from Google Maps Street View
Ottawa Regional Society of Architects — Architecture of the Ottawa Train Station (Archived)
Photos of Ottawa Train Station
The Railways of Ottawa – Colin Churcher's Railway Pages
The Beachburg Sub – Blogging about railways from Ottawa and beyond

Via Rail stations in Ontario
Railway stations in Ottawa
Buildings and structures completed in 1966
Modernist architecture in Canada
Railway stations in Canada opened in 1966
Designated heritage railway stations in Ontario
1966 establishments in Ontario
Railway stations in Ontario
Transport in Ottawa
Buildings and structures in Ottawa